Sibynophis collaris, commonly known as the common many-toothed snake, Betty's many toothed snake or the collared black-headed snake, is a species of colubrid snake endemic to South and East Asia.

Description

Rostral scale twice as broad as deep, just visible from above; suture between the internasals shorter than that between the prefrontals; frontal longer than its distance from the end of the snout, as long as the parietals or shorter; loreal as long as or a little longer than deep; one preocular; two postoculars, only the upper in contact with the parietal; temporals 1 (or 2) + 2; 9 or 10 upper labials, fourth, fifth, and sixth entering the eye; 4 lower labials in contact with the anterior chin shields, which are as long as the posterior chin shields. Dorsal scales smooth, without apical pits, in 17 rows. Ventrals 159–190; anal divided; subcaudals divided, 102–131.

Brown above, vertebral region greyish, usually with a series of small round black spots; head with small black spots or vermiculations above, and two black crossbands, one across the posterior part of the frontal and supraoculars, the other across the occiput; a large black nuchal spot or crossband, bordered with yellow posteriorly; a black line from the nostril to the nuchal spot, passing through the eye, bordering the white black-dotted upper lip. Lower parts yellowish, each ventral with an outer black spot or streak, which may be confluent on the posterior part of the body; anterior ventrals with a pair of median dots in addition.

Total length 29 inches (737 mm); tail 9.5 inches (241 mm).

Distribution
Tehri Garhwal, Uttarakhand, Sub-Himalayan India (Assam, Simla), Mizoram, Bhutan, Nepal, Myanmar, Thailand, Laos, Vietnam, Cambodia, West Malaysia, China (southeastern Tibet and Yunnan), and Taiwan. Record from Jeju, the southernmost major island of South Korea, refers to Sibynophis chinensis.

(Type locality: Khasi Hills, India)

Notes

Further reading
 Gray, J.E. 1853. Descriptions of some undescribed species of Reptiles collected by Dr. Joseph Hooker in the Khassia Mountains, East Bengal, and Sikkim Himalaya. Ann. Mag. Nat. Hist. (2) 12: 386–392. (Psammophis collaris, p. 390.)

External links
 http://www.ecologyasia.com/verts/snakes/mountain-many-tooth-snake.htm

Sibynophis
Snakes of Asia
Reptiles of Bhutan
Reptiles of Cambodia
Snakes of China
Reptiles of India
Reptiles of Laos
Reptiles of Malaysia
Reptiles of Myanmar
Reptiles of Nepal
Reptiles of Taiwan
Reptiles of Thailand
Snakes of Vietnam
Taxa named by John Edward Gray
Reptiles described in 1853